Cambodian Cultural Village (CCV) was a theme park and cultural museum in Siem Reap, Cambodia.

The theme park was constructed in 2001 and opened to the public on 24 September 2003. It covers a total area of 210,000 square meters. The CCV presents miniature versions of important historical buildings and structures, together with local customs. There are eleven unique villages, representing the varied culture heritage of nineteen ethnic groups.  At each village are wood houses, carvings in stone, traditional performances in different styles such as Apsara dancing, performances of ethnic minorities from the northeastern part of Cambodia, traditional wedding ceremony rites, circuses, folk games, peacock dancing, acrobatics, elephant shows, boxing, caves of hell and more.

Cambodian Cultural Village was considered by some as "kitsch", but was popular with Cambodians and other Asian visitors. It includes a wax museum displaying scenes from the culture and history of Cambodia.

Cambodian Cultural Village permanently closed in November 2020 following the collapse in the tourism industry caused by the COVID-19 pandemic. On June 18, 2022, the park was reopened under the name of “ Angkor Green Park” and operated by Dara Group Company.

References

External links 
 Cambodian Cultural Village website

2001 establishments in Cambodia

Museums established in 2003
Amusement parks in Cambodia
Museums in Siem Reap
Wax museums
History museums